Ştiinţa Bacău was a Romanian football club located in Bacău. The team was founded in 1965 and dissolved in 1975.

History
The short 10 years history of the team 1965-1975  was a rich one in memories and went from enthusiastic students with talent and eagerness to 
assert, who were led by a young coach Corneliu Costinescu. Among the successful achievements of the team, he was a 1966 city champion, regional 
champion in 1967, then joined Divizia C in 1968 and promoted in  Divizia B, starting with 1969.

In 1975, Știința Bacău and CAROM Onești merged, the first one being absorbed by the second one. After the merge, CAROM was moved to Borzești, a 
village (now part of Onești) and renamed as CSM Borzești.

Honours
Divizia B
Best finish 3rd: 1973–74
Divizia C
Winners (1): 1968–69
Bacău Regional Championship
Winners (1): 1967–68

References

Defunct football clubs in Romania
Association football clubs established in 1965
1965 establishments in Romania
Association football clubs disestablished in 1975
1975 disestablishments in Romania